James Wakhungu Situma (born 11 November 1984 in Ndivisi, Bungoma, Kenya) is a retired Kenyan football player who  played for Tusker in the Kenyan Premier League and the Kenya national team. He can play as a central defender or as a central midfielder. He achieved great success in his first spell at Sofapaka before his move to KF Tirana, winning 4 trophies during his 4 years at the club including their first ever Kenya Premier League title as well as captaining the side in the CAF Champions League. He also played for Mathare United FC and Kakamega Homeboyz FC before hanging up his boots in 2019. The “Fun Fact” is that Situma served as a captain in all the club's that he traded his services in Kenya. He currently serves as the President of the Kenya Footballers Mathare United FC Association (KEFWA), a body that articulates for issues related to contracted soccer players in Kenya. Part time he serves also as a pundit and youth coach in Nairobi, Kenya running a soccer academy known as Inspire Soka Academy.

Career

KF Tirana
He signed a two-year contract with KF Tirana on 2 July 2011, making him the first Kenyan to ever play in Albania. He made his Tirana debut in a UEFA Europa League qualifying match against Slovakian side Spartak Trnava on 14 July 2011, he started the game in the centre of midfield and helped his side to a goal less draw.

Situma's first trophy in European and Albanian football came in just his second game, as he won the 2011 Albanian Supercup against the champions of Albania Skënderbeu Korçë in a 1–0 win.

Tusker
On 26 January 2015, it was announced that Situma joined Tusker from A.F.C. Leopards. He made his debut for Tusker in a 1–1 draw against Thika United at the Thika Municipal Stadium, on the side's first league game of the 2015 season on 21 February.

Honours
Sofapaka
Kenyan Premier League (1): 2009
Kenyan President's Cup (1): 2009
Kenyan Super Cup (2): 2009, 2010

KF Tirana
Albanian Supercup (1): 2011

Personal life
He is the second of three children to Japheth and Anne Wakhungu; his brothers' names are Alfred and Cyrus. His inspirations are Dennis Oliech and McDonald Mariga.

References

External links

Profile at Sofapaka.com

1984 births
Living people
Kenyan footballers
Association football defenders
KF Tirana players
Sofapaka F.C. players
Nairobi City Stars players
Tusker F.C. players
Kategoria Superiore players
Kenyan Premier League players
Kenya international footballers
Kenyan expatriate footballers
Kenyan expatriate sportspeople in Albania
Expatriate footballers in Albania